Crying Laughing Loving Lying is a 1972 release by Labi Siffre.

All songs were written, performed and produced by Labi Siffre. The album was recorded at Chappell Studios in London.

The record contains two of Labi's best known songs: "It Must Be Love" (No. 14, 1971) (later covered by and a No. 4 hit for Madness, for which Siffre himself appeared in the video) and "Crying Laughing Loving Lying" (No. 11, 1972).

Both "It Must Be Love" and "Crying Laughing Loving Lying" were released as singles in the U.S. by Bell Records but failed to chart.  The album was never released in the U.S. Siffre had his first U.S. singles success as a songwriter when, in 1983, the cover version of "It Must Be Love" by Madness peaked in the Billboard Hot 100 chart at No. 33.

Olivia Newton-John covered "Crying, Laughing, Loving, Lying" on her 1975 album, Clearly Love.

Kanye West sampled "My Song" on his track "I Wonder".

The remastered album was released on CD in 2006 by EMI, featuring six bonus tracks and liner notes by Labi Siffre.

"Gimme Some More" was used in a 2020 Hershey's commercial.

Whitney covered "Crying Laughing Loving Lying" on their 2020 album Candid.

Track listing
All tracks composed and arranged by Labi Siffre
 "Saved" – 2:11
 "Cannock Chase" – 4:07
 "Fool Me a Goodnight" – 3:45
 "It Must Be Love" – 3:57
 "Gimme Some More" – 2:55
 "Blue Lady" – 5:06
 "Love Oh Love Oh Love" – 4:27
 "Crying Laughing Loving Lying" – 3:03
 "Hotel Room Song" – 2:54
 "My Song" – 4:44
 "Till Forever" – 1:15
 "Come On Michael" - 2:58

Bonus tracks on 2006 CD reissue
 "You Make It Easy" - 4:12
 "Good Old Days" - 3:12
 "Pristine Verses" - 3:03
 "You'll Let Me Know" - 3:50
 "Oh Me Oh My Mr City Goodbye" - 3:52
 "For The Lovin'" - 4:30

Personnel
Labi Siffre - vocals, guitar, bass, piano, electric piano, organ, celesta 
Les Hurdle, Dave Richmond - bass
Brian Bennett, Barry De Souza - drums
Francis Monkman, Peter Robinson - electric piano
Richard Tattersall - ukulele 
Harry Cornet, Ray Warleigh, Alan Skidmore, Don Fay - flute
Hugh Potts, Jeff Bryant, Martyn Ford - French horn
Stephen Maw, Vanessa Poole, Robin Thompson - bassoon
Richard Studt - string leader
Nick Ingman - conductor

References

External links
Labi Siffre's own website

1972 albums
Labi Siffre albums
Albums with cover art by Hipgnosis